Morgan Irene Hentz (born July 27, 1998) is an American professional volleyball player who plays as a libero for the United States women's national volleyball team.

Early life
Hentz was born to Mike and Kerin Hentz and grew up in Lakeside Park, Kentucky. She is the oldest of four siblings. 

Hentz began playing volleyball while in third grade. She gained an interest in volleyball because she wanted to play with friends and enjoyed traveling to tournaments.  She attended Notre Dame Academy where she played volleyball and graduated in 2016. She finished high school as the 22nd ranked recruit in the nation and was named Kentucky's Gatorade Player of the Year as a senior. She committed to Stanford University to play collegiate volleyball.

Career

College
While at Stanford, Hentz was the starting libero all four years. She helped Stanford win NCAA national championships in 2016, 2018 and 2019. She was named Pac-12 libero of the year in 2017, 2018, and 2019, and was a three-time AVCA First Team All-American. She finished her Stanford career with 2,310 digs, which ranks first all time in Stanford volleyball history and fourth all time in Pac-12 history.

In addition to playing on Stanford's indoor team, she also played on Stanford's beach volleyball team in 2017, 2018 and 2019.

Professional clubs

  Dresdner SC (2020–2021)
  Athletes Unlimited (2022)

USA National Team
Hentz was invited to play on the U.S. national team in 2020, but the COVID-19 pandemic shut down training. In May 2022, Hentz made her national team playing debut when she was named to the 25-player roster for the 2022 FIVB Volleyball Nations League tournament. In her first match, a win vs. the Dominican Republic, she had a team-leading 15 digs and 10 excellent receptions.

Awards and honors

Clubs
 2020–2021 German Bundesliga –  Champion, with Dresdner SC.
 2020–2021 German Women's Volleyball Super Cup –  Silver medal, with Dresdner SC.
 2021–22 German Cup –   Bronze medal, with Dresdner SC.
 2022 Athletes Unlimited –  Champion
 2022 Athletes Unlimited "Best Libero"
 2022 Athletes Unlimited "Defensive Player of the Year"

College
2016  NCAA Division I National Champions
2018  NCAA Division I National Champions
2019  NCAA Division I National Champions

Pac-12 Libero of the Year (2017, 2018, 2019)
AVCA First Team All-American (2017, 2018, 2019)
co-NCAA Most Outstanding Player (2018)

References

1998 births
Living people
Sportspeople from Kentucky
Liberos
American women's volleyball players
Stanford Cardinal women's volleyball players
American expatriate sportspeople in Germany
People from Campbell County, Kentucky
20th-century American women
21st-century American women